Burgos-Rosa de Lima railway station serves the Spanish city of Burgos, Castile and León. The station opened in 2008, named after the politician Rosa de Lima Manzano Gete responsible for the Directorate-General for Traffic and killed in service in 1988 in a helicopter accident. This railway station serves around 300,000 passengers a year.

Services
Burgos-Rosa de Lima is served by Alvia trains to Madrid-Chamartín and Barcelona Sants; and regional trains from A Coruña to Hendaye, Gijón, Bilbao-Abando and Vitoria-Gasteiz.

References

Railway stations in Spain opened in 2008
Railway stations in Castile and León
Buildings and structures in Burgos